To run the gauntlet means to take part in a form of corporal punishment in which the party judged guilty is forced to run between two rows of soldiers, who strike out and attack them with sticks or other weapons.

Metaphorically, this expression is also used to express the idea of a public trial that one must overcome.

Etymology and spelling
It was borrowed into English in the 17th century, probably from English and Swedish soldiers fighting in the Protestant armies during the Thirty Years' War. The spelling changed with the pronunciation. Both senses of gauntlet had the variant spelling gantlet. For the punishment, the spelling gantlet is preferred in American English usage guides by Bryan Garner and Robert Hartwell Fiske and is listed as a variant spelling of gauntlet by American dictionaries. British dictionaries label gantlet as American.

Predecessor in antiquity

A similar practice involving cudgeling (clubbing) was used in the Ancient Greek and Roman militaries as a form of execution or severe military punishment.

In the Roman army, it could also be applied to every tenth man of a whole unit as a mode of decimation.

Post-Roman usage

A very similar military punishment found in later armies was known as "running the gauntlet". A subaltern walked in front of him with a blade to prevent him from running. The condemned might sometimes also be dragged through by a rope around the hands or prodded along by a pursuer.

Various rules might apply, such as banning edged weapons, requiring the group to keep one foot in place, or allowing the soldier to attempt to protect his head with his hands. The punishment was not necessarily continued until death. If so, he might be finished off when unable to walk or if he managed to reach the end of rows. Running the gauntlet was considered far less of a dishonor than a beating (with exposure to ridicule) on the pillory or stocks, since one could "take it like a man" upright and among soldiers.

In some traditions, if the condemned was able to finish the run and exit the gauntlet at the far end, his faults would be deemed paid, and he would rejoin his comrades with a clean slate. Elsewhere, he was sent back through the gauntlet until death.  

A naval version of the gauntlet was historically used in the Royal Navy as a punishment for minor offences such as leaving the crew berths in an unsanitary state, or failing to return on time from leave.  The condemned was ordered to make a prescribed number of circuits around the ship's deck, while his shipmates struck him with improvised versions of the cat o' nine tails. Runs of the gauntlet could also be preceded by a dozen lashes from the boatswain's cat o' nine tails, so that any subsequent blows from the crew would aggravate the lacerations on his back. The effectiveness of the punishment would somewhat depend on the popularity of the sailor being punished, and the seriousness of the offence. In 1760 Francis Lanyon, a seaman aboard the guardship , was sentenced to three runs of the gauntlet, for failing to return from leave. The crew clearly disagreed with the punishment, as the ship's lieutenant later recorded that Lanyon received no substantive injury from the process. The naval punishment of running the gauntlet was abolished by Admiralty Order in 1806.

In the early records of the Dutch colonial settlement of New Amsterdam appears a detailed description of running the "Gantlope/Gantloppe" as a punishment for the "Court Martial of Melchior Claes" (a soldier).  It states "... The Court Marshall doe adjudge that hee shall run the Gantlope once the length of the fort, where according to the Custome of that punishment the souldyers shall have switches delivered to them with which they shall strike him as he passes through them stript to the wast, and at the fort gate the Marshall is to receive him and there to kick him out of the Garrison as a cashiered person where hee is no more to returne ..."

In Sweden, running the gauntlet was also a civilian punishment for certain crimes until the 18th century. The practice also persisted in parts of Germany (mainly Prussia) and Austria as the Spießrutenlaufen, or "pike-run", and also in Russia, until the 19th century.

In popular culture
A notable description of the process appears in Tolstoy's short story "After the Ball"; it is also depicted in Stanley Kubrick's film Barry Lyndon. In Ernest Hemingway's For Whom the Bell Tolls, the aristocrats of the town are subjected to a form of the gauntlet wherein they are led to and run off a cliff by villagers.

An example of the Royal Navy's variation of the gauntlet can be seen in the Hornblower film The Examination for Lieutenant, wherein Acting Lieutenant Hornblower and Matthews take the role of Master-at-Arms and Corporal and lead a sailor through the Gauntlet. The sailor in question was carefully guided through by swordpoint – one sword ahead of him (Hornblower's) to ensure that he did not rush through the Gauntlet, and one sword at his back (Matthews') to ensure he did not run away and was also moved through the Gauntlet. The film shows the lacerations caused by the knittles were effective, with blood running freely down the condemned man's back by the time a halt to the process was called for by Captain Sir Edward Pellew.

In Outlander season four, Ian Murray and Roger Wakefield both run the gauntlet for the Mohawk to determine if they are adopted into the tribe, or must remain prisoners.

The ABBA song "Head over Heels" features the phrase in its metaphorical sense: "Running the gauntlet in a whirl of lace".

The Gauntlet is a 1977 American action thriller film directed by Clint Eastwood, who plays a down-and-out cop who falls in love with a prostitute whom he is assigned to escort from Las Vegas to Phoenix in order for her to testify against the mob. The climax of the film is a modern-day running of the gauntlet: Eastwood drives a partially-armored motorcoach through downtown Phoenix to City Hall, the streets and buildings lined with hundreds of police officers shooting at the motorcoach with pistols, semi-automatic rifles, and shotguns.

Native American usage
A number of Native American tribes of the Eastern Woodlands culture area forced prisoners to run the gauntlet (see Captives in American Indian Wars). The Jesuit Isaac Jogues was subject to this treatment while a prisoner of the Iroquois in 1641. He described the ordeal in a letter that appears in the book The Jesuit Martyrs of North America: "Before arriving (at the Iroquois Village) we met the young men of the country, in a line armed with sticks...", and he and his fellow Frenchmen were made to walk slowly past them "for the sake of giving time to anyone who struck us."

Many years before he became a hero of the American Revolution at the Battle of Bennington, John Stark was captured by natives and forced to run a gauntlet. Knowing what was about to happen Stark stunned them by grabbing the weapon away from the first person about to strike him and proceeded to attack the warrior with it. The warriors and the chief were so surprised by this that they stopped the gauntlet and adopted him into their tribe. He was later ransomed along with Amos Eastman for $163 and returned home.

Modern use
The original meanings of the phrase notwithstanding, the expression (to run) the gauntlet has been applied to various less severe punishments or tests, often consisting of consecutive blows or tasks endured sequentially and delivered collectively, especially by colleagues such as roommates or fraternity brothers. As these do not usually cause serious injuries, only bearable pain, the rituals are sometimes eagerly anticipated by the initiate as a sign of acceptance into a more prestigious group. Because of this, Running the Gauntlet is considered a hazing ritual.

The phrase running the gauntlet has also been used, informally, to express the idea of a public but painless, ritual humiliation such as the walk of shame or perp walk, or to indicate a series of difficult trials that one must overcome.

Fitness trail in communist Poland

In KOR, A History of the Worker's Defense Committee in Poland, 1976–1981, Jan Józef Lipski documents the experience of one such criminal during the June 1976 protests:

Military custom
Similar practices are used in other initiations and rites of passage, as on pollywogs (those passing the equator for the first time; includes a paddling version) or in aviation when a new pilot gets their first license.  It has also been used to "tack on" a recently promoted enlisted person's rank insignia.

In one Tailhook Association convention for Navy and Marine Corps pilots, female participants were allegedly forced to run the gauntlet in a hotel hallway as male participants fondled them.

Sports

In certain team sports, such as lacrosse and ice hockey, the gauntlet is a common name for a type of drill whereby players are blocked or checked by the entire team in sequence.

In Brazilian Jiu-Jitsu, when a student is promoted to their next coloured belt, they are sometimes required to run between two rows of their fellow students, who strike them with their own belts.

Goliardia

See also
 Blanket party
 Mosh pit
 Welcome parade (torture)

References

External links
 A relevant section of the extensive Corpun (corporal punishment) archive
 Historialago.com: "Prizes and punishments" (in Spanish)

Corporal punishments
Physical torture techniques
Swedish words and phrases